Lirim Mema (born 23 January 1998) is a Kosovan professional footballer who plays as an right-back for German club Tasmania Berlin.

Club career

Eintracht Braunschweig II
On 2 August 2017, Mema made his debut with Eintracht Braunschweig II in a Regionalliga Nord match against Lüneburger SK Hansa after being named in the starting line-up.

Flamurtari
On 14 August 2019, Mema joined Albanian Superliga side Flamurtari. On 28 August 2019, he made his debut in a 0–3 home defeat against Kukësi after being named in the starting line-up.

Drita
On 10 February 2020, Mema joined Football Superleague of Kosovo side Drita, on a two-year contract.

International career
On 29 August 2017, Mema received a call-up from Kosovo U21 for a 2019 UEFA European Under-21 Championship qualification matches against Norway U21 and Germany U21. On 1 September 2017, he made his debut with Kosovo U21 in a 2019 UEFA European Under-21 Championship qualification against Norway U21 after being named in the starting line-up.

References

External links

Living people
1998 births
Sportspeople from Tetovo
Kosovo Albanians
Kosovan footballers
Kosovo under-21 international footballers
Macedonian footballers
Macedonian people of Kosovan descent
Albanians in North Macedonia
Association football fullbacks
Tennis Borussia Berlin players
Eintracht Braunschweig players
Eintracht Braunschweig II players
Flamurtari Vlorë players
FC Drita players
FC Rot-Weiß Erfurt players
SV Tasmania Berlin players
Regionalliga players
Oberliga (football) players
Kategoria Superiore players
Football Superleague of Kosovo players
SC Staaken players